There are 64 men's college ice hockey programs competing in the National Collegiate Athletic Association's Division I. Each program employs a head coach. As of the 2021–22 season, the longest-tenured head coach is Rick Gotkin of Mercyhurst, who has been head coach since 1988. There are six new head coaches for the 2022–23 season.

List of coaches
Conference affiliations are current for the next men's hockey season of 2023–24.

See also
List of current NCAA Division I baseball coaches
List of current NCAA Division I men's basketball coaches
List of current NCAA Division I women's basketball coaches
List of current NCAA Division I FBS football coaches
List of current NCAA Division I FCS football coaches
List of NCAA Division I men's soccer coaches

References

External links
D-I Coaching Directory at College Hockey News

 
Coaches
Coach
Ice hockey coaches, men's